Board of Revenue or Revenue Board may refer to

 Board of Revenue of imperial China between the Tang dynasty and the Qing
 Bengal Board of Revenue
 Madras Board of Revenue
 Tamil Nadu Board of Revenue, abolished 1980 and replaced by the Tamil Nadu Department of Revenue

See also
 Andhra Pradesh Revenue Tribunal
 Gujarat Revenue Tribunal
 Maharashtra Revenue Tribunal
 Financial Commissioners of Haryana, Himachal Pradesh, Punjab, & Jammu and Kashmir